Anolis dolichocephalus, the La Hotte long-snouted anole or Place Negre anole, is a species of lizard in the family Dactyloidae. The species is found in Haiti.

References

Anoles
Endemic fauna of Haiti
Reptiles of Haiti
Reptiles described in 1963
Taxa named by Ernest Edward Williams